Robert John Hadley (born 22 October 1951) is a former Welsh cricketer. Hadley was a right-handed batsman who bowled left-arm fast-medium. He was born at Neath, Glamorgan.

While studying at St John's College, Cambridge, Hadley made his first-class debut for Cambridge University against Warwickshire at Fenner's in 1971. He made six further first-class appearances in that season for the university. In that same season he also made two first-class appearances for Glamorgan, against Leicestershire and Somerset in the County Championship. Against Leicestershire he took his maiden five wicket haul, with figures of 5/32 during Leicestershire's first-innings. These were to be his only first-class appearances for Glamorgan. He continued to play first-class cricket for Cambridge University in 1972 and 1973, making seventeen further first-class appearances, the last of which came against Oxford University in The University Match at Lord's. In total he made 24 first-class appearances for the university, taking 47 wickets at an average of 30.17, with best figures of 5/31. These figures were one of two five wicket hauls he took for the university and came against Sussex in 1972. He also made two first-class appearances for a combined Oxford and Cambridge Universities team, against the touring Australians in 1972 and the touring New Zealanders in 1973.

Hadley also appeared in three List A matches for Cambridge University in the 1972 Benson & Hedges Cup, playing against Warwickshire, Worcestershire, and Northamptonshire in the group stages of the competition. He had little success in these matches, taking just a single wicket.

He became a doctor.

References

External links
Robert Hadley at ESPNcricinfo
Robert Hadley at CricketArchive

1951 births
Living people
Alumni of St John's College, Cambridge
Cambridge University cricketers
Cricketers from Neath Port Talbot
Glamorgan cricketers
Oxford and Cambridge Universities cricketers
Welsh cricketers